Lewis J. Stadlen (born March 7, 1947) is an American stage and screen character actor. He is best known for playing Ira Fried in The Sopranos.

Career
Born in Brooklyn, New York, to voice actor Allen Swift, Stadlen studied acting with Sanford Meisner and Stella Adler. He made his Broadway debut as Groucho Marx in the musical comedy Minnie's Boys in 1970. Other noted Broadway roles include Senex in A Funny Thing Happened on the Way to the Forum, Banjo in a revival of The Man Who Came to Dinner, Milt in Laughter on the 23rd Floor, and Dr. Pangloss in the 1973 production of Candide.  He has been nominated for two Tony Awards during his career.

The Time of Your Life was revived on March 17, 1972, at the Huntington Hartford Theater in Los Angeles where Stadlen, Henry Fonda, Richard Dreyfuss, Ron Thompson, Strother Martin, Gloria Grahame, Jane Alexander, Richard X. Slattery and Pepper Martin were among the cast with Edwin Sherin directing.

His autobiography, Acting Foolish, was published by Bear Manor in 2009.

Film and television credits
Stadlen's film credits include Portnoy's Complaint (1972), Serpico (1973), The Verdict (1982), To Be or Not to Be (1983), Windy City (1984), and In & Out (1997).

On television, Stadlen had a regular role in the first season of Benson as John Taylor, Governor Gatling's chief of staff, before being replaced in the second season by René Auberjonois, who assumed the role of Clayton Endicott, Taylor's replacement as chief of staff, on the series. He also has appeared in Law & Order and The Sopranos.

Film credits

Theatre credits
Minnie's Boys (1970)
The Time of Your Life (1972)
The Sunshine Boys (1972)
Candide (1974 revival)
The Odd Couple (1985 revival)
Guys and Dolls (1992 national tour)
Laughter on the 23rd Floor (1993) 
A Funny Thing Happened on the Way to the Forum (1996 revival)
Epic Proportions (1999)
The Man Who Came to Dinner (2000 revival)
45 Seconds from Broadway (2001)
The Producers (2003)
The People in the Picture (2011)
The Nance (2013)
Fish in the Dark (2015)
The Front Page (2016 revival)
Hello, Dolly! (2018 national tour)
Death of a Salesman (2021)

Awards and nominations
1970 Drama Desk Award for Outstanding Performance (Minnie's Boys, winner)
1970 Theatre World Award (Minnie's Boys, winner)
1974 Tony Award for Best Actor in a Musical (Candide, nominee)
1996 Tony Award for Best Featured Actor in a Musical (A Funny Thing Happened on the Way to the Forum, nominee)
2001 Drama Desk Award for Outstanding Featured Actor in a Play (The Man Who Came to Dinner, nominee)

References

Further reading
Acting Foolish, by Lewis J. Stadlen. BearManor Media, Albany, 2009. .

External links

American male musical theatre actors
American male stage actors
American male television actors
American male film actors
People from Brooklyn
1947 births
Living people
Male actors from New York City
20th-century American male actors
21st-century American male actors